Moral law may refer to:

 Moral absolutism, the ethical view that particular actions are intrinsically right or wrong
 The Ten Commandments, in Christianity